Kathy Szeliga (born October 10, 1961) is an American politician who has served as a Republican member of the Maryland House of Delegates since January 12, 2011, and as Minority Whip since 2013. Szeliga was the Republican nominee for the United States Senate in 2016 to replace Barbara Mikulski, who retired.

Background
Szeliga was born in Baltimore, Maryland, in October 1961. She is of Polish descent. She was raised in a military family, her father being a lieutenant colonel in the US Army. Szeliga married her husband in 1980, and the couple struggled financially at first. Szeliga worked as a dishwasher, a maid, and a housekeeper. She entered college in her 30s, enrolling at Towson State University and graduating summa cum laude with a Bachelor of Arts degree in elementary education. She began working as a teacher in Baltimore City Public Schools and started a construction business with her husband. She began her political career after a family friend, James M. Kelly, was elected to the Maryland House of Delegates. She worked as a legislative aide to Del. James M. Kelly, then for Del. John G. Trueschler, and eventually became chief of staff for then-State Senator Andy Harris. Szeliga decided to run for Delegate after Del. J. B. Jennings decided to run for the State Senate. She was elected and immediately placed on the Appropriations Committee.

In the legislature
Szeliga serves on the Environment and Transportation Committee (since 2015), Rules and Executive Nominations Committee (since 2014), and Legislative Policy Committee (since 2015). She was previously a member of the Appropriations Committee (2011–15), House Emergency Medical Services System Work Group (2012), and Joint Committee on the Selection of the State Treasurer (2015). She is a member of the Women Legislators of Maryland Caucus (since 2011), Maryland Legislative Sportsmen's Caucus (since 2012), and Maryland Veterans Caucus (since 2012).

In April 2013, Delegate Szeliga was elected into leadership by her peers and serves as the Whip in the House Republican Caucus. She serves with Leader Nic Kipke of Anne Arundel County. Szeliga is the highest-ranking Republican woman in Maryland's state legislature.

Social media usage

Szeliga has maintained a presence on both Facebook and Twitter (since 2015 and 2009, respectively). She uses both accounts for multiple purposes: event promotions, viewpoints on upcoming bills, and other commentary. On March 26, 2022, Szeliga published a tweet in response to House Speaker Adrienne Jones, using profane language. Shortly thereafter Szeliga removed her response and apologized for it, saying it was intended to be private and was inappropriate.

US Senate campaign

Szeliga announced in November 2015 that she would be running for the Republican nomination to replace Senator Barbara Mikulski in the 2016 US Senate election in Maryland. She was the first Republican in the 2016 Senate primary to release ads on television. On April 15, Citizens United announced they had bought $25,000 worth of radio airtime to promote Del. Szeliga ahead of the April 26 primary. Szeliga won the primary on April 26, 2016, and faced Representative Chris Van Hollen in the general election on November 8, 2016, in which she was defeated by a landslide 61% – 36% spread.

Election results

2018 Republican Primary Election for Maryland House of Delegates – District 7
Voters to choose up to three:
{|  class="wikitable"
|-
!Name 
!Votes
!Percent
!Outcome
|-
|-
|Kathy Szeliga
|7,127
|  23.3%
|   Won
|-
|-
|Richard K. Impallaria
|4,494
|  14.7%
|   Won
|-
|-
|Lauren Arikan
|4,173
|  13.6%
|   Won
|-
|-
|Aaron Penman
|3,216
|  10.5%
|   Lost
|-
|-
|Bill Paulshock
|2,869
|  9.4%
|   Lost
|-
|-
|Michael Geppi
|2,044
|  6.7%
|   Lost
|-
|-
|David Seman
|1,981
|  6.5%
|   Lost
|-
|-
|Tammy Larkin
|1,934
|  6.3%
|   Lost
|-
|-
|Joshua Barlow
|1,548
|  5.1%
|   Lost
|-
|-
|Angela Sudano-Marcellino
|498
|  1.6%
|   Lost
|-
|-
|Russ English, Jr.
|374
|  1.2%
|   Lost
|-
|-
|Norm Gifford
|219
|  0.7%
|   Lost
|-
|-
|Trevor Leach
|148
|  0.5%
|   Lost
|}

2016 General Election for U.S. Senator from Maryland
Voters to choose one:
{| class="wikitable"
|-
!Name
!Votes
!Percent
!Outcome
|-
|-
|Chris Van Hollen
|1,659,907
|  60.9%
|   Won
|-
|-
|Kathy Szeliga
|972,557
|  35.7%
|   Lost
|-
|-
|Margaret Flowers
|89,970
|  3.3%
|   Lost
|-
|Write-Ins
|3,736
|  0.1%
|   Lost
|}

2016 Republican Primary Election for US Senator from Maryland
Voters to choose one:
{|  class="wikitable"
|-
!Name
!Votes
!Percent
!Outcome
|-
|-
|Kathy Szeliga
|135,337
|  35.6%
|   Won
|-
|-
|Chris Chaffee
|52,066
|  13.7%
|   Lost
|-
|-
|Chrys Kefalas
|36,340
|  9.6%
|   Lost
|-
|-
|Richard J. Douglas
|29,007
|  7.6%
|   Lost
|-
|-
|Dave Wallace
|23,226
|  6.1%
|   Lost
|-
|-
|Sean P. Connor
|21,727
|  5.7%
|   Lost
|-
|-
|Lynn Richardson
|20,792
|  5.5%
|   Lost
|-
|-
|John R. Graziani
|16,722
|  4.4%
|   Lost
|-
|-
|Greg Holmes
|16,148
|  4.3%
|   Lost
|-
|-
|Mark McNicholas
|9,988
|  2.6%
|   Lost
|-
|-
|Joseph David Hooe
|8,282
|  2.2%
|   Lost
|-
|-
|Anthony Seda
|3,873
|  1.0%
|   Lost
|-
|-
|Richard Shawver
|3,155
|  0.8%
|   Lost
|-
|-
|Garry Thomas Yarrington
|2,988
|  0.8%
|   Lost
|}

2014 General Election for Maryland House of Delegates – District 7
Voters to choose three:
{| class="wikitable"
|-
!Name
!Votes
!Percent
!Outcome
|-
|-
|Pat McDonough, Rep.
|35,627
|  26.9%
|   Won
|-
|-
|Kathy Szeliga, Rep.
|33,197
|  25.0%
|   Won
|-
|-
|Richard Impallaria, Rep.
|32,560
|  24.6%
|   Won
|-
|-
|Bob Bowle, Jr., Dem.
|11,154
|  8.4%
|   Lost
|-
|-
|Norman Gifford, Jr., Dem.
|10,192
|  7.7%
|   Lost
|-
|-
|Pete Definbaugh, Dem.
|9,707
|  7.3%
|   Lost
|-
|Other Write-Ins
|145
|  0.1%
|   Lost
|}

2014 Republican Primary Election for Maryland House of Delegates – District 7
Voters to choose up to three:
{|  class="wikitable"
|-
!Name
!Votes
!Percent
!Outcome
|-
|-
|Pat McDonough
|6,971
|  29.0%
|   Won
|-
|-
|Kathy Szeliga
|6,125
|  25.5%
|   Won
|-
|-
|Richard K. Impallaria
|5,790
|  24.1%
|   Won
|-
|-
|David Seman
|3,483
|  14.5%
|   Lost
|-
|-
|Tina Sutherland
|1,675
|  7.0%
|   Lost
|}

2010 General Election for Maryland House of Delegates – District 7
Voters to choose three:
{| class="wikitable"
|-
!Name
!Votes
!Percent
!Outcome
|-
|-
|Richard Impallaria, Rep.
|27,217
|  23.1%
|   Won
|-
|-
|Pat McDonough, Rep.
|25,450
|  21.6%
|   Won
|-
|-
|Kathy Szeliga, Rep.
|24,573
|  20.9%
|   Won
|-
|-
|Jeff Beard, Dem.
|14,885
|  12.6%
|   Lost
|-
|-
|Kristina A. Sargent, Dem.
|13,551
|  11.5%
|   Lost
|-
|-
|James Ward Morrow, Dem.
|11,960
|  10.2%
|   Lost
|-
|Other Write-Ins
|111
|  0.1%
|   Lost
|}

2010 Republican Primary Election for Maryland House of Delegates – District 7
Voters to choose up to three:
{|  class="wikitable"
|-
!Name
!Votes
!Percent
!Outcome
|-
|-
|Pat McDonough
|6,479
|  27.2%
|   Won
|-
|-
|Richard K. Impallaria
|5,678
|  23.8%
|   Won 
|-
|-
|Kathy Szeliga
|4,021
|  16.9%
|   Won
|-
|-
|Brian Bennett
|1,838
|  7.7%
|   Lost
|-
|-
|Marilyn Booker
|1,808
|  7.6%
|   Lost
|-
|-
|Roger Zajdel
|1,783
|  7.5%
|   Lost
|-
|-
|John Cromwell
|1,031
|  4.3%
|   Lost
|-
|-
|Jim Berndt
|873
|  3.7%
|   Lost
|-
|-
|Laine O. C. Clark
|312
|  1.3%
|   Lost
|}

References

External links
 Official Senate Campaign Site
 
 

1961 births
21st-century American politicians
21st-century American women politicians
American politicians of Polish descent
American women educators
Candidates in the 2016 United States Senate elections
Educators from Maryland
Living people
People from Baltimore County, Maryland
Politicians from Baltimore
Republican Party members of the Maryland House of Delegates
Towson University alumni
Women state legislators in Maryland